Ulpiano Volpi or Volpiano Volpi (1559 – 10 March 1629) was an Italian Roman Catholic prelate who served as Archbishop (Personal Title) of Novara (1619–1629), and Archbishop of Chieti (1609–1615).

Biography
Ulpiano Volpi was born in Como, Italy in 1559.
On 11 March 1609, he was appointed during the papacy of Pope Paul V as Archbishop of Chieti.
On 5 April 1609, he was consecrated bishop by Michelangelo Tonti, Bishop of Cesena, with Domenico Rivarola, Titular Archbishop of Nazareth, and Alessandro Borghi, Bishop Emeritus of Sansepolcro, serving as co-consecrators. 
He served as Archbishop of Chieti until his resignation on 16 December 1615. 
On 13 November 1619, he was appointed during the papacy of Pope Paul V as Archbishop (Personal Title) of Novara.
He served as Archbishop of Novara until his death on 10 March 1629.

His palace home, the Palazzo Volpi in Como was converted into the town civic art gallery.

Episcopal succession

References

External links and additional sources
 (for Chronology of Bishops) 
 (for Chronology of Bishops) 
 (for Chronology of Bishops) 
 (for Chronology of Bishops) 

17th-century Italian Roman Catholic archbishops
Bishops appointed by Pope Paul V
1559 births
1629 deaths